Wierna rzeka may refer to:
 Wierna rzeka (1936 film)
 Wierna rzeka (1983 film)